Fitbit (stylized as fitbit) is an American consumer electronics and fitness company. It produces wireless-enabled wearable technology, physical fitness monitors and activity trackers such as smartwatches, pedometers and monitors for heart rate, quality of sleep and stairs climbed as well as related software. The company was acquired by Google in January 2021.

In 2019, Fitbit was the fifth largest wearable technology company in shipments. The company has sold more than 120 million devices and has 29 million users in over 100 countries.

History
The company was founded as Healthy Metrics Research, Inc. in San Francisco, California on March 26, 2007 by James Park (CEO) and Eric Friedman (CTO). In October 2007, it changed its name to Fitbit, Inc.

In January 2015, the company successfully defended against a trademark lawsuit from Fitbug. On March 5, 2015, Fitbit acquired fitness coaching app developer Fitstar for $17.8 million. In June 2015, the company became a public company via an initial public offering, raising $732 million.

In May 2016, Fitbit acquired a wearable payment platform from smart credit card company Coin. In October 2016, CEO James Park announced that the company was undergoing a major transformation from what he called a "consumer electronics company" to a "digital healthcare company." On December 6, 2016, Fitbit acquired assets from Pebble for $23 million.

On January 10, 2017, Fitbit acquired Romania-based smartwatch startup Vector Watch SRL.

On February 13, 2018, Fitbit acquired Twine Health. In February 2018, Fitbit announced a partnership with Adidas to release an Adidas-branded Fitbit Ionic; it was released on March 19, 2018. In August 2018, Blue Cross Blue Shield Association announced a partnership with Fitbit in which BCBS will include Fitbit's wearables and fitness trackers in its Blue365 program.

In January 2021, Fitbit was acquired by Google and absorbed into its hardware division. The acquisition was scrutinized by regulators concerned over Google's access to personal data in both the United States and Europe.

Products

The first product released was the Fitbit Tracker, which was released in 2009.

In 2014, Fitbit began offering activity trackers, along with a website and a mobile app for iOS, Android and Windows 10 Mobile This allows the trackers to sync to devices such as mobile phones via Bluetooth, or to a Bluetooth-equipped computer running Windows or MacOS. Users have the ability to log their food, activities, and weight, to track over time and set daily and weekly goals for themselves for steps, calories burned and consumed, and distance walked. The app also offers a community page where users can challenge themselves and compete against other users. The social element anticipates an increase in motivation, and finds that users take an average of 700 more steps per day when they have friends on the app. Users can also choose to share their progress pictures and achievement badges.

In 2017, the company released its Fitbit Ionic smartwatch,  and in 2018, it released a redesigned, lower-priced version of the smartwatch called the Versa. 

The Fitbit Charge 3, a wristband health and fitness tracker introduced in October 2018, was the first device to feature an oxygen saturation (SPO2) sensor; however, as of January 2019, it was non-functional and Fitbit did not provide an implementation timeline.

The Fitbit Charge 3 comes with two different-sized bands: small and large. Additionally, the screen is larger than the Charge 2 by approximately 40%. Fitbit Charge 3 comes in two color combos: a Rose-Gold case with a Blue Grey band and a “Graphite Aluminum” screen case with a Black band.

On December 17, 2018, Fitbit released the Fitbit OS 3.0, which included an extended dashboard, quick logging for weight and water intake, and goal-based exercise mode. The new extended on-device dashboard (Fitbit Today) would include more data regarding sleep, water intake and weight.

There are three versions of the Fitbit Versa, standard, Special, and Lite. 

In December 2018, Fitbit added an API and open source tools to allow developers to better build apps for its smartwatch products.

On January 2, 2019, the company announced the release of the Fitbit Charge 3 in India. 

On June 3, 2020, during the COVID-19 pandemic, the company announced Fitbit Flow, a ventilator in response to the shortages of ventilators in medical centers and hospitals around the world which are needed to treat critically ill patients. Despite getting emergency approval from the Food and Drug Administration, the company does not consider Fitbit Flow as a drop-in replacement for traditional ventilators. Instead, the product is meant as an alternative when more the expensive option of traditional ventilators is not available. Therefore, the company intends for Fitbit Flow to be used only during the COVID-19 pandemic.

In August 2020, Fitbit also announced new smartwatches, the Versa 3, the Inspire 2, and the Fitbit Sense, which includes new health metrics and analysis such as stress sensing, oxygen saturation, and skin temperature. The Sense also promises to show changes in skin temperature to catch signs of sickness.

Certain Sense, Versa, Ionic, and Charge products support Fitbit Pay, which is a digital wallet that uses near field communication to make payments at point of sale.

In August 2022, Fitbit announced new smartwatches, the Versa 4, the Inspire 3, and the Sense 2, featuring incremental improvements mainly in fitness tracking features and battery life over the last iterations.

Reception

Awards
In 2008, Fitbit was named the runner-up at TechCrunch50, and in 2009, it was named both the "Innovation honoree" and "best in the Health & Wellness category" at CES. In 2016, Fitbit ranked 37th of 50 for most innovative companies for that year. Also in 2016, Fitbit was ranked #46 on the Deloitte Fast 500 North America list.

Accuracy
A small 2015 study had participants wear multiple devices on their wrists and hips while performing different walking/running speeds on a treadmill. Fitbit devices that are worn on the hip accurately measured steps taken within 1 step of 100% accuracy. Devices were worn on the wrist, however, were off by an average of 11 steps per minute. When measuring the number of calories burned, Fitbit devices worn on the hip underestimated by an average of 6%, while devices worn on the wrist overestimated calories burned by 21%. Authors concluded that both the Fitbit One and Fitbit Flex devices reliably measured step counts and energy expenditure, with hip-based Fitbit devices being more accurate than wrist-based devices.

A 2019 study found that the Fitbit Charge 2 accurately measures the average heart rate of healthy adults during sleep, and that it is most accurate for medium range of heart rate.

A 2019 study found that Fitbit Charge 2 relative to EEG, overestimated sleep efficiency by about 4%, but there was no difference in measured total sleep time.

A 2019 review found that Fitbit devices, which utilize the sleep-staging feature, show a better performance than non-sleep-staging models, especially in differentiating wake from sleep.

Recalls
On February 20, 2014, Fitbit worked with the U.S. Consumer Product Safety Commission (CPSC) to recall the Fitbit Force because some users experienced allergic reactions to the materials used in the product. On March 12, 2014, the CPSC made the recall official. At that time, there were 9,900 reports of skin irritation and 250 reports of blistering.

In April 2017, a woman claimed her Flex 2 device malfunctioned and caught fire, causing second-degree burns on her arm. Following an investigation, Fitbit was adamant that the exploding tracker was caused by external forces, and assured customers that it was not aware of any other complaints and that they could wear their own Fitbits without concern.

On March 2, 2022, Fitbit issued a voluntary recall of its Ionic smartwatches after reports of overheating batteries which caused skin burns for some owners. At the time of the recall, there were 78 reports of skin burns.

Privacy concerns

Public data-sharing by default 
To set up and use Fitbit devices, users must create an account with Fitbit and agree to data collection, transfer and privacy rules. Starting in June 2011, Fitbit was criticized for its website's default activity-sharing settings, which made users' manually-entered physical activities available for public viewing. All users had the option to make their physical activity information private, but some users were unaware that the information was public by default. One specific issue, which technology blogs made fun of, was that some users were including details about their sex lives in their daily exercise logs, and this information was, by default, publicly available. Fitbit responded to criticism by making all such data private by default and requesting that search engines remove indexed user profile pages from their databases.

Google's acquisition 
The acquisition by Alphabet has resulted in concern that Fitbit user data could be combined with other Google services data or sold for purposes such as targeted advertising. There are also concerns that user data could be sold to health insurance companies. In response, Fitbit stated in 2019 that user data would not be used or sold for advertising by Google, citing that trustworthiness was "paramount" to the company, and that the sale would not change their historic commitment to user privacy and security.

Use in court cases
The company's devices have also been used in criminal investigations; in one instance, a rape claim against an unnamed intruder was turned around to a criminal charge for false reports based on data from the claimant's Fitbit.

On March 10, 2015, a woman allegedly fabricated a story in which an intruder appeared in her employer's home she was staying at and raped her. She told police that a man had assaulted her around midnight. Police found a Fitbit lying on the floor when they arrived at the scene. Prosecutors used the Fitbit as evidence and data to determine what had occurred. The Fitbit revealed that the woman was active throughout the night, and the Fitbit surveillance analysis demonstrated the woman had not gone to bed as she stated to the police, proving that the woman had lied to the police.

In 2017, a Fitbit device played a role in solving a murder. Victim Connie Dabate was murdered by her husband Richard Dabate. Initially, Richard framed the situation, telling police and law enforcement officials that an intruder had broken into their home and fatally shot his wife. However, Connie's Fitbit tracker showed that she was at the gym at the time Richard told police his wife was shot. Using Connie's Fitbit and analyzing her movements, analysts were able to create a timeline that proved Richard had created a false story.

In 2018, a Fitbit device played a role in solving another murder. Anthony Aiello murdered his stepdaughter Karen Navarra while visiting her home and her body was found five days later. Data from her Fitbit fitness tracker showed that her heart rate spiked when Aiello visited her and stopped five minutes before he left. Aiello was arrested in September 2018 on murder charges and was booked into the Santa Clara County Jail.

See also
 Quantified self

References

External links

 

American companies established in 2007
Google acquisitions
Android (operating system) software
2007 establishments in Delaware
Companies formerly listed on the New York Stock Exchange
Electronics companies established in 2007
Electronics companies of the United States
Exercise equipment companies
Fitness apps
IOS software
Manufacturing companies based in San Francisco
Technology companies based in the San Francisco Bay Area
Universal Windows Platform apps
2015 initial public offerings
2021 mergers and acquisitions